Farma is the Polish version of the reality television franchise The Farm. The series was announced in late 2021 to air on Polsat in early 2022. A group of contestants live on a farm in conditions that existed 100 years ago. They have to carry out tasks to earn prizes and luxury for the farm. The winner will receive 100,000 zł

The first season premiered on 17 January 2022 on Polsat.

The second season premiered on 2 January 2023.

References

External links

The Farm (franchise)
Polish reality television series
2020s Polish television series